Setanta is a genus of ichneumonid wasp in the subfamily Ichneumoninae. It occurs in the Neotropical, Oriental, and Tropical regions.

Species
 Setanta abita (Cresson, 1873) c g e
 Setanta albitarsis  Heinrich, 1974 c g e
 Setanta apicalis (Uchida, 1926) c e
 Setanta birmanica  Heinrich, 1974 c g
 Setanta caerulea (Brulle, 1846) c 
 Setanta centrosa (Cresson, 1868) c g e
 Setanta chichimeca (Cresson, 1868) c g e
 Setanta compta (Say, 1835) c g b e
 Setanta compta marginata (Provancher, 1882)    c b e
 Setanta decorosa (Cresson, 1868) c g e
 Setanta dura (Cresson, 1874) c g e
 Setanta formosana (Uchida, 1926) c e
 Setanta guatemalensis (Cameron, 1885) c e
 Setanta himalayensis (Cameron, 1905) c e
 Setanta maculosa (Smith, 1879) c g e
 Setanta malinensis  Heinrich, 1934  c g e
 Setanta nedumalba  Heinrich, 1974 c g e
 Setanta nigricans (Uchida, 1926) c e
 Setanta nigrifrons (Uchida, 1926) c g e
 Setanta opacula (Cresson, 1874) c g e
 Setanta parsimonica (Cameron, 1885) c g e
 Setanta rufipes Cameron, 1901 c e
 Setanta urumuchiensis Yu & Sheng, 1994 c g e

Data sources: c = Catalogue of Life, g = GBIF, b = Bugguide.net, e = Encyclopedia of Life,

References

External links
images representing Setanta at Consortium for the Barcode of Life

Ichneumoninae
Ichneumonidae genera
Taxa named by Edward Yerbury Watson